Led Zeppelin's 1977 North American Tour was the eleventh and final concert tour of North America by the English rock band. The tour was divided into three legs, with performances commencing on 1 April and concluding on 24 July 1977. The tour was originally intended to finish on 13 August, but was cut short following the death of Robert Plant's son.

Overview
This was the first tour embarked on by the band following their enforced lay-off caused by Plant's car accident in Greece in 1975. During this sabbatical, the band had recorded their seventh studio album, Presence. Rehearsals for the tour eventually took place at Manticore Studios, Fulham in early 1977, where the band worked for two months on a new set list.

Led Zeppelin's manager Peter Grant conceived this series of concerts as an effort that would reassert Led Zeppelin as the dominant band of the decade. Fifty one concerts were scheduled over a three-leg period, for 1.3 million ticket holders. It was Led Zeppelin's biggest ever tour, and tickets sold at a rate of 72,000 a day.

The tour was scheduled to commence on 27 February at Fort Worth, Texas, but Plant contracted laryngitis and the schedule was postponed for a month. It eventually kicked off on 1 April, at the Dallas Memorial Auditorium in Dallas. The delay reduced the amount of time the band had available to rehearse, since all their equipment had already been airlifted to the United States. As guitarist Jimmy Page explained:

Led Zeppelin's 1977 North American Tour was a massive financial success, as the band sold out large arenas and stadiums. On 30 April they performed to 76,229 people at the Pontiac Silverdome a new world record attendance for a solo indoor attraction, beating the 75,962 that The Who attracted there on 6 December 1975 for Opening Night, and grossed $792,361.50 (also a record breaker). Lengthy stints were spent in New York City and Los Angeles, where the band performed six sold-out shows each at Madison Square Garden and the Los Angeles Forum. In New York, the band did not advertise the concerts, relying solely on street demand to sell out the shows; enough ticket applications were received to sell out a further two nights had time permitted.

Dave Lewis, an expert on the band, considers that this tour,

For the tour, the band chartered Caesar's Chariot, a 45-seat Boeing 707 owned by the Caesars Palace Hotel in Las Vegas, to shuttle them between cities. This plane should not be confused with the more famous Starship, which had been used by the band on its previous two concert stints in North America, but which was permanently grounded in 1977 due to engine problems.

For many of the concerts on this tour, Jimmy Page chose to wear a striking custom-made white silk dragon suit or as it was known as the "Poppy White Dragon Suit", as is captured in several famous photographs of the band. It was also on this tour that John Paul Jones introduced a custom triple-necked acoustic instrument which contained a mandolin, twelve-string guitar and six-string guitar. He used this instrument on "Ten Years Gone" and the acoustic portion of the setlist.

Keith Moon sat in with the band on 23 June 1977, at the Los Angeles Forum.

Problems experienced
Though profitable financially, the tour was beset with difficulties. On 19 April, over 70 people were arrested as about 1,000 ticketless fans tried to gatecrash Cincinnati Riverfront Coliseum for two sold out festival seating/general admission concerts, while some gained entry by throwing rocks and beer bottles through glass entrance doors and some wall height, all-glass panes surrounding the outermost perimeter of the arena. On 3 June, after an open-air concert at Tampa Stadium was cut short because of a severe thunderstorm, a riot broke out in the audience, resulting in 19 arrests and 50 fans being injured. Police ultimately resorted to  using tear gas to break up the crowd. 

Guitarist Jimmy Page's ongoing heroin addiction also caused him to lose a noticeable amount of weight on this tour, and arguably began to hamper his performances. During a performance in Chicago on 9 April, Page fell ill and needed to sit in a chair to play "Ten Years Gone" before leaving the stage with severe stomach cramps. The show was concluded after only sixty-five minutes, with Page's illness later being attributed to a case of food poisoning; shortly thereafter, a makeup concert was scheduled for 3 August on the final leg of the tour. The Greensboro, North Carolina show began one hour late, with Plant stating, "Sorry, we left somebody in New York."

The tour also experienced some unsavory backstage problems, exacerbated by the hiring of London gangster John Bindon as Led Zeppelin's security coordinator.  After a 23 July show at the "Day on the Green" festival at Oakland–Alameda County Coliseum in Oakland, California, Bindon, band manager Peter Grant, tour manager Richard Cole and drummer John Bonham were arrested when a member of promoter Bill Graham's staff was beaten after the performance. Graham's security man Jim Matzorkis had assaulted Peter Grant's 11-year-old son Warren for allegedly taking a dressing room sign. This was seen by Bonham, who then walked over and kicked the man; later, when Grant was informed of this incident, he went into the trailer, along with Bindon and assaulted the man with tour manager Richard Cole guarding the door; Bindon had stated he was provoked by members of Graham's crew prior to the incident.

Led Zeppelin's second Oakland show took place only after Bill Graham signed a letter of indemnification absolving Led Zeppelin from responsibility for the previous night's incident, but Graham refused to honour the letter and assault charges were laid against Grant, Cole, Bindon, and Bonham when the band arrived back at their hotel. The four received bail, and a suit was filed against them by Graham for $2 million. All four pleaded nolo contendere, receiving suspended sentences and fines.

The following day's second Oakland concert would prove to be the band's final live appearance in the United States. After the performance, news came that Plant's five-year-old son, Karac, had died from a stomach virus. The rest of the tour (including the Chicago Stadium makeup show, a second concert at the venue, and five additional concerts at the Louisiana Superdome, Rich Stadium, the Pittsburgh Civic Arena and John F. Kennedy Stadium) was immediately cancelled.

In recent years, Plant has reflected on the negative dynamics which increasingly became evident as the 1977 tour progressed:

According to Jack Calmes, the head of Showco (the company that had provided lights, sound, staging, and logistics for the band's American tours since 1973):

Recordings
At least three indoor concerts from this tour (at Pontiac on 30 April, Houston on 21 May and Seattle on 17 July) were professionally shot by the TV International company for the band and projected live on to a giant video screen. None of these performances have been officially released, and to date, only the Seattle video and audio of the Houston show have been made available on unofficial Led Zeppelin bootleg recordings. Producer Jimmy Page was unable to locate multi-track sound recordings from any 1977 shows, and it is unknown if any exist. However, portions of the Seattle video (minus audio) were used to promote the Led Zeppelin Remasters release in 1990 and some were aired as part of the special MTV Led Zeppelin documentary. In addition, parts were included in the 1997 "Whole Lotta Love" promo.

Audio recordings from many of the tour's shows have been preserved on unofficial bootleg recordings. Notable bootlegs from this tour include Destroyer (the soundboard recording from Cleveland on 27 April), Listen to This Eddie (an audience recording from Los Angeles on 21 June) and For Badgeholders Only (an audience recording from Los Angeles on 23 June).

The second disc of the Led Zeppelin DVD contains semi-hidden bootleg footage from the show at the Los Angeles Forum (under the promos menu).  The menu background audio features the complete opening number from the 21 June 1977 show ("The Song Remains the Same") with visuals bootlegged from various shows on the 1977 tour.

Tour set list
The set list played on this tour included an acoustic section, which had originally been revived by the band at their previous concerts at Earls Court Arena in 1975 and was retained for the 1977 concerts due to the lingering effects of Plant's injuries. Technically, only two songs from their most recent album, Presence (1976), were performed: "Nobody's Fault but Mine" and "Achilles Last Stand", although parts of the solo from "Tea for One" would be incorporated by Page during the solo of "Since I've Been Loving You".

All tracks written by Jimmy Page and Robert Plant, except where noted.

The basic set list for the tour was:

"The Song Remains the Same" 
"The Rover" (intro)/"Sick Again"
"Nobody's Fault but Mine"
"In My Time of Dying" (Page, Plant, Bonham, Jones) (Replaced with "Over the Hills and Far Away"* on 10 June 1977)
"Since I've Been Loving You" (Page, Plant, Jones)/ "Tea for One" (solo)
"No Quarter" (Page, Plant, Jones)
"Ten Years Gone"
"The Battle of Evermore" (With John Paul Jones on vocals, singing Sandy Denny's parts from the studio version. On some dates John Bonham also sang accompanying vocals along with Jones)
"Going to California"
"Dancing Days" (on 26 May and 27 June only)
"Black Country Woman" / "Bron-Yr-Aur Stomp" (Page, Plant, Jones)
"White Summer"/"Black Mountain Side" (Page)
"Kashmir" (Bonham, Page, Plant)
"Out on the Tiles" (intro)/"Over the Top"/"Moby Dick" (Page, Jones, Bonham)
"The Star-Spangled Banner" (Smith) / "JP solo" (Page)
"Achilles Last Stand"
"Stairway to Heaven"

Encores typical of the first leg of the tour:
"Rock and Roll" (Page, Plant, Jones, Bonham)
"Trampled Under Foot" (Page, Plant, Jones)
Encores typical of the second and third leg:
"Whole Lotta Love" (Introduction) (Bonham, Dixon, Jones, Page, Plant)
"Rock and Roll" (Page, Plant, Jones, Bonham)
Other encores played occasionally:
"Heartbreaker" (Bonham, Page, Plant) (Played on 10, 11, 13 and 21 June)
"Black Dog" (Page, Plant, Jones) (Played on 13 and 19 April, 31 May, 13 June, and 23 July)
"It'll Be Me" (Clement) (Played on 22 May and 26 June)
"Communication Breakdown" (Bonham, Jones, Page) (Played on 25 June)

There were some set list substitutions, variations, and order switches during the tour: "Trampled Under Foot" and "Heartbreaker" were played as part of the main set on some occasions.

*The band performed "In My Time of Dying" during the 1st leg and the first half of the 2nd leg, while they switched to "Over the Hills and Far Away" for the second half of the 2nd leg and for the 3rd leg, although "In My Time of Dying" appeared a few times on the final shows of the 2nd leg.

Tour dates
The original itinerary before Plant's laryngitis consisted of:

While the final dates performed/scheduled were:

Box office score data

References

Sources
Lewis, Dave and Pallett, Simon (1997) Led Zeppelin: The Concert File, London: Omnibus Press. .

External links
 Article about the tour by rock journalist Steven Rosen
Comprehensive archive of known concert appearances by Led Zeppelin (official website)
Led Zeppelin concert setlists
Led Zeppelin 1977 Tour Programme
Interview conducted with Jimmy Page during the tour
View in Google Earth

Led Zeppelin concert tours
1977 concert tours
1977 in North America